Viljandi Handball Club is an Estonian handball team from Viljandi. They compete in Meistriliiga and Baltic Handball League.

Accomplishments

Meistriliiga: 
Runner-Up (1) : 2016, 2017

Team

Current squad 

Squad for the 2019–20 season 

Goalkeepers
 Kevin Pajuväli
 Peeter Parik

Wingers
RW
  Andrei Khapal 
  Mark Lõpp
  Kevin Hunt
LW 
  Madis Parik
  Mikk Varik
  Robin Liinsoo
  Martin Braun
  Henn-Hendrik Sepp
Line players 
  Kristjan Koovit
  Mark Lõpp
  Raiko Roosna

Back players
  Simon Drõgin
  Sergei Rodjukov
  Vladimir Maslak
  Aleksander Pertelson
  Mihkel Lõpp
  Oliver Ruut
  Hendrik Koks

References

External links

Team page at eurohandball.com

Estonian handball clubs
Sport in Viljandi